Christian Christiansen may refer to:

Christian Christiansen (musician) (1884–1955), Danish musician
Christian Christiansen (physicist) (1843–1917), Danish physicist
Christian E. Christiansen (born 1972), Danish filmmaker